John Warren Cooke (February 28, 1915 – November 28, 2009) was an American politician and newspaper publisher. A Democrat, he served in the Virginia House of Delegates 1942–1980 and was its Speaker from 1968 until his retirement.

Personal life; non-political career
Cooke was born in Mathews, Virginia, to Giles Buckner Cooke and the former Katharine Grosh. His father, an Episcopal minister, had been a major in the Confederate States Army, serving on the personal staff of Robert E. Lee.

Attending both public and private schools, Cooke graduated from Lee-Jackson High School in Mathews. He spent one year at the Virginia Military Institute, then went to work for the Mathews County government, serving as clerk of the county school board, among other tasks.

Cooke married Anne Brown Rawn of Huntington, West Virginia on May 10, 1947. They had a son and a daughter.

Career
Cooke was president of Tidewater Newspapers, Inc. in Gloucester, Virginia and published the Gloucester-Mathews Gazette-Journal newspaper from 1954 until March 2009.

Cooke was elected to the Virginia House of Delegates in 1941, representing Mathews and Gloucester Counties on the Middle Peninsula. The seat had been briefly held by James Bland Martin, and before that for many years by John Tabb DuVal of Gloucester County, although for four years (1929-1933) it had been held by Emma Lee Smith White of Mathews, and Cooke later said that until postwar redistricting, an informal understanding had been that a person from Gloucester County would serve two terms, then allow someone from Mathews county to hold the office. In 1944, Middlesex County was added to the district. That same year, he became secretary of the House Democratic caucus.

Cooke was an alternate delegate to the 1948 Democratic National Convention. He became Democratic caucus leader in 1950 and majority floor leader in 1956. In 1965, Charles City and New Kent Counties on the Virginia Peninsula were added to the district.

Cooke was elected House Speaker on January 10, 1968, replacing the retiring E. Blackburn Moore. That year he co-sponsored the Virginia Freedom of Information Act.

In 1971 Cooke's district changed one more time, dropping Charles City and New Kent Counties and adding Essex, King and Queen and King William Counties. Cooke retired in 1979.

Death and legacy
Cooke died on November 28, 2009, at his home in Mathews County at the age of 94.

Notes

References

External links

1915 births
2009 deaths
Speakers of the Virginia House of Delegates
Democratic Party members of the Virginia House of Delegates
Virginia Military Institute alumni
People from Mathews, Virginia
20th-century American politicians